Fodil Hadjadj (born April 18, 1983 in Bologhine, Alger) is an Algerian former football player.

Career
Hadjadj began his career in the junior ranks at MC Alger. During a tournament with the MCA's junior team in France, he was noticed by scouts for FC Nantes and signed to the academy team there. In 2003, he signed a 2-year professional contract with FC Nantes and went on to make 23 appearances and scoring 1 goal for the club in his 2 seasons at the club. In 2005, despite interest from several Italian Serie B teams, he returned to MC Alger.

International career
Hadjadj was part of the Algerian 2004 African Nations Cup team, who finished second in their group in the first round of competition before being defeated by Morocco in the quarter-finals.

National team statistics

Honours
 Won the Algerian Cup twice with MC Alger in 2006 and 2007
 Won the Algerian Super Cup twice with MC Alger in 2006 and 2007
 Won the Algerian Championnat National once with MC Alger in 2010

References

External links
 DZFoot.com Profile

1983 births
2004 African Cup of Nations players
Algeria international footballers
Algerian footballers
Algerian expatriate footballers
Algerian expatriate sportspeople in France
Algerian Ligue Professionnelle 1 players
Algerian Ligue 2 players
CS Constantine players
MC Alger players
CR Belouizdad players
Expatriate footballers in France
FC Nantes players
Kabyle people
Ligue 1 players
Living people
Footballers from Algiers
Association football midfielders
21st-century Algerian people